Magdalena C. A. M. De Galan (born 23 September 1946) is a Belgian politician from the Socialist Party. She is the current mayor in Forest and a member of Brussels Parliament.

Political career
 Minister of Health and Social Affairs for the government of the French Community (1992–1994)
 Minister for Social Affairs (1994–1999)
 Mayor in Forest (1999–2001 and 2007– 2015)

Private life
She has six grandchildren (Clémentine, Louise, Achille etc.)

References

External links 
  Official site

Socialist Party (Belgium) politicians
1946 births
Living people
Members of the Parliament of the Brussels-Capital Region
Women mayors of places in Belgium
Members of the Parliament of the French Community
21st-century Belgian politicians
21st-century Belgian women politicians